Zośka may refer to:

A diminutive form of Polish name Zofia (disambiguation)
Zoska Veras (1892–1991), writer
Zośka, code-name of Polish national hero Tadeusz Zawadzki
Battalion Zośka, elite unit of Warsaw Uprising
Polish word for Hacky Sack

Polish feminine given names